Turtleback Mountain is a  mountain in the Ossipee Mountains located in Carroll County, New Hampshire, standing above Bald Knob.  The summit features columnar jointing and was once home to an observation tower.

See also

 List of mountains in New Hampshire

External links
  Turtleback Mountain - FranklinSites.com Hiking Guide

Mountains of New Hampshire
Mountains of Carroll County, New Hampshire